Dave Holmes is a Canadian professor of nursing, researcher, and author based in Ottawa, Ontario, Canada. His research and writing are focused in the fields of public health, forensic nursing, critical theory, epistemology, law, ethics, psychiatric nursing, correctional nursing, the sociopolitical aspects of nursing, sexuality, and public health nursing.

Biography 
Holmes earned his bachelor's degree in nursing from the University of Ottawa in 1991, his MSc in nursing from the Université de Montréal in 1998, and his PhD in nursing from the Université de Montréal in 2002. In 2003, he completed a CIHR postdoctoral fellowship in health care, technology, and place at the University of Toronto, Faculty of Social Work. Since then he has been principal investigator on CIHR and SSHRC funded research projects on risk management in the fields of public health and forensic nursing. Most of Holmes's work and research is based on the poststructuralist works of Gilles Deleuze, Félix Guattari, and Michel Foucault. He has presented at several national and international conferences.

Holmes teaches postgraduate courses at the University of Ottawa. Since 2009 he holds a University Research Chair in Forensic Nursing. Holmes has also been an Honorary Visiting Professor at Binawan Institute of Health Sciences. 

In 2020, Holmes has been identified as one of the top 2% worldwide scientists by a team of researchers based at Stanford University, United States.

Works 
He has authored over 165 articles in peer-reviewed journals, 50 book chapters, and 6 books. Professor Holmes was also one of the interviewees for Philosophy of Nursing: 5 Questions.

References

External links 
 

1967 births
Anglophone Quebec people
Canadian non-fiction writers
Living people
People from Montreal
Academic staff of the University of Ottawa
University of Ottawa alumni
Writers from Quebec